The viridans streptococci are a large group of commensal streptococcal Gram-positive bacteria species that are α-hemolytic, producing a green coloration on blood agar plates (hence the name "viridans", from Latin "vĭrĭdis", green), although some species in this group are actually γ-hemolytic, meaning they produce no change on blood agar. The pseudo-taxonomic term "Streptococcus viridans" is often used to refer to this group of species, but writers who do not like to use the pseudotaxonomic term (which treats a group of species as if they were one species) prefer the terms viridans streptococci, viridans group streptococci (VGS), or viridans streptococcal species.

These species possess no Lancefield antigens. In general, pathogenicity is low.

Identification
Viridans streptococci can be differentiated from Streptococcus pneumoniae using an optochin test, as viridans streptococci are optochin-resistant; they also lack either the polysaccharide-based capsule typical of S. pneumoniae or the Lancefield antigens of the pyogenic members of the genus.

Pathology
The organisms are most abundant in the mouth, and one member of the group, S. mutans, is the cause of dental caries in most cases and populations. S. sanguinis is also another potential cause. Others may be involved in other mouth or gingival infections as pericoronitis. If they are introduced into the bloodstream, they have the potential of causing endocarditis, in particular in individuals with damaged heart valves.  They are the most common causes of subacute bacterial endocarditis. Viridans streptococci are identified in cases of neonatal infections.

Viridans streptococci have the unique ability to synthesize dextrans from glucose, which allows them to adhere to fibrin-platelet aggregates at damaged heart valves. This mechanism underlies their ability to cause subacute valvular heart disease following their introduction into the bloodstream (e.g., following dental extraction).

Identification 
Phenotypic and biochemical identification

Identification of VGS to the species level can be difficult, and phenotypic identification is not always accurate. The name "viridans" is somewhat of a misnomer, as many species do not produce any hemolysis on blood agar. From a classification perspective, it is not useful to try to differentiate alpha-hemolysis from a lack of hemolysis on blood agar plates (sometimes referred to as "gamma-hemolysis"); this feature can vary widely with the growth medium used to cultivate the organism, as well as the incubation temperature. Lack of alpha hemolysis does not seem to correlate with the clinical outcome or severity of disease; no enzymatic or toxigenic effect has ever been documented as a by-product of alpha hemolysis.

Under the microscope, bacteria from the viridans group are gram-positive cocci in chains. They do not express catalase and so are catalase-negative. They are leucine aminopeptidase positive, pyrrolidonylarylamidase negative, and do not grow in 6.5% NaCl, and almost all species are negative for growth on bile esculin agar. They differ from pneumococci in that they are optochin resistant and are not bile soluble. However, Richter et al. examined misidentification of VGS submitted to antimicrobial surveillance programs as pneumococci and found that the distinction of S. pneumoniae from the VGS can be difficult, which is not surprising in light of the fact that S. mitis and S. oralis possess >99% sequence homology with S. pneumoniae (47). The authors also found that optochin disk testing did not perform as well as bile solubility testing for identification; in a survey of 1,733 isolates tested, bile solubility testing had higher sensitivity and specificity for differentiation of VGS from pneumococci (47).

S. anginosus group
The S. anginosus group of organisms can be beta-, alpha- or nonhemolytic. The isolates lacking beta-hemolysis are generally those grouped with the VGS. S. constellatus is the most likely of this group to be beta-hemolytic. There is some evidence implicating beta-hemolytic S. constellatus subsp. pharyngis as a cause of pharyngitis (55). S. intermedius is the species in this group most commonly isolated from brain and liver abscesses. The S. anginosus group can possess Lancefield group antigens A, C, G, and F, although S. intermedius almost never possesses Lancefield group antigens. Isolates of the S. anginosus group have a characteristic "butterscotch" odor. Members of the group are universally positive for three biochemical reactions: acetoin production from glucose (positive Vogues–Proskauer reaction), arginine, and sorbitol. These are very useful for the differentiation of this group from other VGS.

S. mitis group.
The S. mitis group of organisms contains several species and is biochemically very inert, which can make species level identification very challenging. The use of invalid species names has also been a particular problem with the S. mitis group. Isolates in this group are negative for acetoin production, arginine, esculin, and mannitol and are sorbitol fermentation negative (14). S. pneumoniae is a recently characterized member of the S. mitis group (1). As the organism is closely related to S. pneumoniae and other S. mitis group organisms, accurate identification can be difficult. S. pseudopneumoniae lacks the pneumococcal capsule and is resistant to optochin when incubated in an atmosphere with elevated CO2 but is susceptible when incubated in ambient air. Bile solubility is a more specific test for S. pseudopneumoniae than optochin susceptibility, as the organism is not bile soluble (1).

S. sanguinis group
The genetically heterogeneous S. sanguinis group was formerly known as S. sanguinis. Some taxonomists have lumped the S. sanguinis group in with the S. mitis group based on 16S rRNA gene sequence analysis, but S. sanguinis group organisms exhibit divergent phenotypic characteristics. Isolates in the S. sanguinis group are arginine and esculin positive. Like members of the S. mitis group, they are negative for acetoin production and mannitol and sorbitol fermentation. The S. sanguinis group includes S. sanguinis, S. parasanguinis, and S. gordonii (14).

S. salivarius group
The S. salivarius group is closely related to the S. bovis group. Species from this group that have been isolated from human infection include S. salivarius and S. vestibularis, as well as S. thermophilus, which has been identified from dairy products. S. salivarius group organisms are positive for acetoin production and are esculin positive but are negative for arginine hydrolysis and fermentation of mannitol and sorbitol.

S. mutans group
Members of the S. mutans group are primarily isolated from the human oral cavity and includes several species that are phenotypically similar. S. mutans and S. sobrinus are the species within this group most commonly isolated from human infection. They do not hydrolyze arginine but are positive for acetoin production, esculin hydrolysis, and mannitol and sorbitol fermentation.

Automated biochemical methods for identification
For the VGS, the use of automated systems for identification has historically been reported as problematic, and this theme applies to multiple automated methodologies. One of the major factors affecting the quality of the identifications generated is that the systems may not have all species represented in their databases (32). In one investigation comparing the accuracy of the Vitek2 ID-GPC card to that of conventional agar-based biochemical methods for identification of a variety of Gram-positive and Gram-negative organisms, 72% of Gram-positive isolates were accurately identified by the Vitek2 system (21). Among the most problematic identifications (whether incorrectly identified or unresolved) were the VGS; S. anginosus, S. mutans, and S. sanguinis were misidentified as other VGS species and, in some instances, as S. pneumoniae (21).

An investigation into the ability of the BD Phoenix system SMIC/ID panel to identify Streptococcus spp. classified 97 consecutive clinical isolates of streptococci, including 34 isolates of VGS, with biochemical methods as the reference method (26). Ninety-one percent of the streptococcal isolates showed agreement between the Phoenix and the reference method. Of the 12 S. mitis group isolates tested, the Phoenix system correctly identified seven isolates, with two discordant identifications, and there were three isolates for which the Phoenix system did not produce any identification. Of 22 S. anginosus group isolates, 18 were correctly identified and four were discordant. A second study evaluated the Phoenix SMIC/ID-2 panel using the API 20 Strep system as a comparator method (resolving discrepant results via 16S rRNA gene sequencing and amplification and sequencing of housekeeping genes) (5). For the VGS, 31 isolates were assayed, with only 53% concordance between the Phoenix and reference methods for S. mitis group organisms, 100% concordance for the S. anginosus group, and 75% concordance for S. sanguinis group organisms (5).

Sequence-based identification
Historically, DNA–DNA hybridization studies have been used to confirm species level identifications for the VGS. However, these procedures are not practical for clinical laboratories to use for identification of these organisms. Other sequence-based identification systems have subsequently been introduced for VGS species level identification. In general, 16S rRNA gene sequencing results in poor resolution to species level in the VGS. This is due to the high degree of 16S rRNA gene homology in this group of organisms; S. mitis, S. oralis, S. pseudopneumoniae, and S. pneumoniae almost always have >99% sequence homology in this gene. In light of the high degree of 16S rRNA gene sequence similarity, sequencing of alternative gene targets for reliable identification to the species level has been explored. One promising target, rnpB, was explored by Innings et al., who analyzed two variable regions of rnpB by pyrosequencing (28). Of the 43 species analyzed, all were identified to species level, except for two isolates: S. anginosus/S. constellatus and S. infantis/S. peroris. rnpB can be used for identification of VGS with high-level resolution. One other successful approach is sequence analysis of the manganese-dependent superoxide dismutase gene, described by Poyart et al. This technique was used to accurately differentiate over 29 streptococcal species, including 16 VGS species, with clear differentiation of S. mitis, S. oralis, and S. pneumoniae (44, 45). Other techniques that have been used, with various degrees of success, are sequence analysis of the 16S-23S intergenic spacer region, d-alanine-d-alanine ligase gene sequencing, and hyaluronate lyase gene sequencing.

References

Further reading

Streptococcaceae
Gram-positive bacteria